3 Boötis is a close binary star system in the northern constellation of Boötes, located 310 light years away from the Sun based upon parallax. It can be viewed with the naked eye in excellent seeing conditions as a dim star with an apparent visual magnitude of 5.97. The system is moving further from the Earth with a heliocentric radial velocity of 12 km/s.

This is a double-lined spectroscopic binary system with an orbital period of 36 days and an eccentricity of 0.543. The orbital plane is inclined 74.5° and the system does not form an eclipsing binary. The primary component is an evolving star currently in the Hertzsprung gap. Its companion is a main sequence star. Both members have more mass than the Sun and they are around 1.5 billion years old.

References

External links
 HR 5182
 Image 3 Boötis

G-type giants
A-type main-sequence stars
Spectroscopic binaries
Boötes
Durchmusterung objects
Bootis, 03
120064
067239
5182